Henry Crabb Robinson (13 May 1775 – 5 February 1867) was an English lawyer, remembered as a diarist. He took part in founding London University.

Life
Robinson was born in Bury St. Edmunds, Suffolk, third and youngest son of Henry Robinson (1736-1815) and Jemima (1736-1793), daughter of Denny Crabb, a landowner, maltster, and deacon of the congregational church at Wattisfield, Suffolk, and sister of Habakkuk Crabb. After education at small private schools, he was articled in 1790 to an attorney in Colchester. At Colchester he heard John Wesley preach one of his last sermons. In 1796, he entered the office of a solicitor in Chancery Lane, London; but in 1798 a relative died, leaving Robinson a sum yielding a considerable yearly income. Proud of his independence and eager for travel, he went abroad in 1800. Between 1800 and 1805, he studied at various places in Germany, meeting men of letters there, including Goethe, Schiller, Johann Gottfried Herder and Christoph Martin Wieland. He then became correspondent for The Times in Altona in 1807. Later on he was sent to Galicia, in Spain, as a war correspondent in the Peninsular War.

On his return to London in 1809, Robinson decided to quit journalism and studied for the Bar, to which he was called in 1813, and became leader of the Eastern Circuit. Fifteen years later he retired, and by virtue of his conversation and qualities became a leader in society. He was one of the founders of the London University (now University College London) and travelled several times to Italy, as many of his contemporaries did. Among those whom he befriended in Rome in 1829 was the novelist Sarah Burney.

Robinson died unmarried, aged 91. He was buried in a vault in Highgate Cemetery alongside his friend Edwin Wilkins Field. A bust of Crabb Robinson was made, and a portrait by Edward Armitage.

Works
Robinson's Diary, Reminiscences and Correspondence was published posthumously in 1869. It contains reminiscences of central figures of the English romantic movement: including Coleridge, Charles Lamb, William Blake, William Wordsworth, and of other writers such as Sarah Burney. They are documents on the daily lives of London writers, artists, political figures and socialites. In his essay on Blake, Swinburne says, "Of all the records of these his latter years, the most valuable, perhaps, are those furnished by Mr. Crabb Robinson, whose cautious and vivid transcription of Blake's actual speech is worth more than much vague remark, or than any commentary now possible to give."
 
In 1829, Robinson was made a fellow of the Society of Antiquaries (F.S.A.), and contributed a paper to Archæologia entitled "The Etymology of the Mass".

His diaries were bequeathed to Dr Williams's Library, because Robinson had been a member of the Essex Street Chapel, the first avowedly Unitarian congregation in England.

References

Attribution

Further reading
Diana Behler: "Henry Crabb Robinson as a Mediator of Lessing and Herder to England". In: Lessing Yearbook 7 (1975), pp. 105–126
Diana Behler: "Henry Crabb Robinson: A British Acquaintance of Wieland and his Advocate in England". In: Christoph Martin Wieland. Nordamerikanische Forschungsbeitrage zur 250. Wiederkehr seines Geburtstages 1983. Ed. Hansjörg Schelle. Tübingen, 1984, pp. 539–571
Diana Behler: "Henry Crabb Robinson and Weimar". In: A Reassessment of Weimar Classicism, ed. Gerhart Hoffmeister. Lewiston (NY), 1996, pp. 157–180
Lorna J. Clark, ed.: The Letters of Sarah Harriet Burney. Athens, Georgia, and London: University of Georgia Press, pp. 125–130, 133–143 and passim
Edith Morley. The Life and Times of Henry Crabb Robinson. London: J. M. Dent & Sons, 1935

External links

 Henry Crabb Robinson Project, website of the Queen Mary University of London

1775 births
1867 deaths
Burials at Highgate Cemetery
English diarists
English barristers
Writers from Bury St Edmunds
Fellows of the Society of Antiquaries of London
English war correspondents
English Unitarians
19th-century diarists